She's 19 and Ready (also known as Sunnyboy und Sugarbaby) is a 1979 German sex comedy film.

Plot
The story centers on a rather uninhibited young woman named Eva (Sabine Wollin) and her two boyfriends - Stefan (Ekkehardt Belle) and Claus (Claus Obalski). Eva needs to decide which of the two is to be her "steady". While pondering that question, Eva inherits some overseas properties from a rich uncle. The three of them embark on a world tour to exotic places, meeting up with Eva's cousin Britta (Gina Janssen) along the way. At the film's conclusion, Eva's "choice" is to keep both young men as beaus.

Cast
Sabine Wollin as Eva
Ekkehardt Belle as Stefan
 as Claus
Gina Janssen as Britta

Soundtrack
The film's music soundtrack contained original songs by Gerhard Heinz and also includes the contemporary European hits, "You're the Greatest Lover" by Luv' over the opening credits, "Dschinghis Khan" in a dance club performed by the band themselves and "Slip Away Susie" by Bernie Paul in a music video style sequence during a guest appearance by Bernie himself.

Airplay
The film received a good deal of airplay in the early 1980s on HBO and other cable TV pay channels which sought R-rated programming not available on regular TV.

External links

1979 films
German sex comedy films
West German films
Films directed by Franz Josef Gottlieb
Films scored by Gerhard Heinz
1970s German-language films
1970s sex comedy films
Constantin Film films
1979 comedy films
1970s German films